Robby Ameen (born December 7, 1960) is an American drummer, composer, bandleader, and educator who resides in New York City. Although he is of Lebanese Druze origin, Ameen is best known for the unique and powerful Afro-Cuban style he has created. He is regarded as one of the world's most prominent drummers in the area of Latin Jazz.

In 1985 he became a member of Ruben Blades’ Seis del Solar band. Other long-term band memberships include Dave Valentin, Conrad Herwig’s “Latin Side of… All Stars", Kip Hanrahan, and Jack Bruce and the Cuicoland Express. In 2011 Ameen won a Latin Grammy for best Salsa record with Ruben Blades and Seis del Solar, “Todos Vuelven Live, Vol. 1 and 2.” As a sideman he has recorded on other Grammy winning records including Ruben Blades and Seis del Solar's “Escenas” and Brian Lynch's “Simpatico”. In 2012, Ameen was the subject of an episode of the Emmy Award-winning Detroit Public Television series “Arab American Stories”.

Early life and education
Ameen was born in 1960 in New Haven, Connecticut.

Studied drum set with CJ Everett, Ed Blackwell, and classical percussion with Fred Hinger.

BA Literature,  Yale University, 1982

Career
As a sideman, Ameen has recorded extensively with such artists as Ruben Blades, Dizzy Gillespie, Dave Valentin, Eddie Palmieri, Paul Simon, Jack Bruce, Kip Hanrahan, Conrad Herwig, Carly Simon, Mongo Santamaria, Hilton Ruiz, Kirsty MacColl, and many others. As a session musician Ameen has recorded numerous jingles, film scores, and TV music, including the popular HBO series Sex and the City.

As an educator, Ameen is the co-author with bassist Lincoln Goines of the best-selling instructional book “Funkifying the Clave: Afro-Cuban drums for Bass and Drums” (Alfred Music), and the follow-up DVD, “Funkifying the Clave: Afro-Cuban drums for Bass and Drums” (Alfred Music). 
He is an international clinician and percussion/drum festival participant, including the Modern Drummer Festival and PASIC. He is currently on the faculty at Mason Gross School of the Arts at Rutgers University.

Discography

As a leader
 Robby Ameen Diluvio  (2020) Origin Records
 Robby Ameen Days in the Night (2015) Two and Four Records
 Robby Ameen Days in the Life (2009) Two and Four Records

As a co-leader

 Horacio "el Negro" Hernandez and Robby Ameen  Robby and Negro at the Third World War (2006) American Clave/Enja
 El Negro and Robby Onto the Street (2003) EWE
 El Negro and Robby Band Live at Umbria Jazz (2004) Il Manifesto
 Seis del Solar Decision (1992) Messidor
 Seis del Solar Alternate Roots (1995) Messidor
 Overproof Three Guys Walk into a Bar (2004) EWE

As a sideman (selected)
With Dizzy Gillespie
 Dizzy Gillespie New Faces (1984) GRP
 Dizzy Gillespie Endlessly (1988) MCA
 With Ruben Blades
 Ruben Blades y Seis del Solar Escenas (1985) Elektra-Asylum
 Ruben Blades y Seis del Solar Agua de Luna (1986) Elektra-Asylum
 Ruben Blades Nothing But the Truth (1988) Elektra-Asylum
 Ruben Blades  Ruben Blades y Son del Solar...Live! (1990) Elektra-Asylum
 Ruben Blades and Son del Solar Caminando (1991) Sony
 Ruben Blades and Son del Solar Amor y Control (1992) CBS Records
 Ruben Blades and Seis del Solar Todos Vuelven Live, Vol. 1 (2011) Ruben Blades Productions
 Ruben Blades and Seis del Solar Todos Vuelven Live, Vol. 2 (2011) Ruben Blades Productions
 With Paul Simon
 Paul Simon Songs from the Capeman (1997) Warner Bros. Records
 Paul Simon  The Capeman (Original Broadway Cast Recording) (1998)
 With Dave Valentin

 Dave Valentin Kalahari (1984) GRP
 Dave Valentin Jungle Garden (1985) GRP
 Dave Valentin Light Struck (1986) GRP
 Dave Valentin Mind Time (1987) GRP
 Dave Valentin Live at the Blue Note (1988) GRP
 Dave Valentin Two Amigos (1990) GRP
 Dave Valentin Musical Portraits (1991) GRP
 Dave Valentin Red Sun (1993) GRP
 Dave Valentin Tropic Heat (1994) GRP
 Dave Valentin Primitive Passions (1996) RMM Records
 Dave Valentin Sunshower (1999) Concord Vista
 Dave Valentin World on a String (2005) HighNote Records
 Dave Valentin Come Fly with Me (2006) HighNote Records
 Dave Valentin Pure Imagination (2011) HighNote Records
 With Eddie Palmieri
 Eddie Palmieri Ritmo Caliente (2003) Concord Picante
 Eddie Palmieri El Rumbero del Piano (1998) RMM/Universal
 Eddie Palmieri Palmas (1994) Nonesuch
 Eddie Palmieri Sueno (1982) Intuition
 With Conrad Herwig
 Conrad Herwig Another Kind of Blue: The Latin Side of Miles Davis(2004) Half Note
 Conrad Herwig Que Viva Coltrane (2004) Criss Cross
 Conrad Herwig Sketches of Spain y Mas: The Latin Side of Miles Davis (2006) Half Note
 Conrad Herwig The Latin Side of Wayne Shorter (2008) Half Note
 Conrad Herwig The Latin Side of Herbie Hancock (2010) Half Note
 Conrad Herwig The Latin Side of Joe Henderson (2014) Half Note
 Conrad Herwig The Latin Side of Horace Silver (2021) Savant
 Conrad Herwig  The Latin Side of Charles Mingus (2022) Savant
 With Kip Hanrahan
 Kip Hanrahan Crescent Moon Waning (2018) American Clave
 Kip Hanrahan  Beautiful Scars  (2007) Enja/Weber
 Kip Hanrahan  Pinero (2002)  American Clave
 Kip Hanrahan Shadow Nights, Vol. 2' (1999) American Clave
 Kip Hanrahan A Thousand Nights and a Night(Shadow Night (1997) American Clave
 Kip Hanrahan All Roads Are Made of the Flesh (1995) American Clave
 Kip Hanrahan Exotica (1992) American Clave
 Kip Hanrahan Days and Nights of Blue Luck Inverted (1988) American Clave
 Kip Hanrahan Tenderness (1990) American Clave
 With Jack Bruce
 Jack Bruce Live at the Milkyway (2011) EMI
 Jack Bruce More Jack Than God (2003) Sanctuary
 Jack Bruce Live at the Canterbury Fayre (2003) Classic Rock Productions
 Jack Bruce Shadows in the Air (2001) Sanctuary
 Carly Simon This Kind of Love (2008) Hear Music
 Steve Swallow Swallow (Xtra Watt, 1991)
 Mongo Santamaria Mongo Returns! (1998) Milestone
 Hilton Ruiz Strut (1989) Novus
 Kirsty MacColl Electric Landlady (1991) BMG/Union Square Music
 Bill O'Connell Wind off the Hudson (2019) Savant
 Bill O'Connell Jazz Latin (2018) Savant
 David Byrne Rei Momo (1989) Sire/Luaka Bop
 Brian Lynch Simpatico (2006) Artist Share
 Deep Rumba A Calm in the Fire of Dances (2000) American Clave
 Deep Rumba This Night Becomes a Rumba (1998) American Clave
 Michael Reissler Big Circle (2012) Intuition
 Michael Reissler Honey and Ash (1998) Enja
 Michael Reissler Momentum Mobile (1995) Enja
 Conjure Bad Mouth (2006) American Clave
 Conjure Cab Calloway Stands in for the Moon (1995) American Clave
 Daniel Ponce Chango te Llama (1991) Mango
 Milton Cardona Cambucha (1999) American Clave
 Silvana DeLuigi Yo (2004) American Clave
 Earl Klugh Midnight in San Juan (1990) Warner Bros.
 Tim Ries The Rolling Stones Project (2008) Concord Jazz
 Ramsey Lewis Legends of Jazz with Ramsey Lewis (Box Set) (2006) Evosound
 Combo Piano (Takuma Watanabe) Agatha (2011) EWE
 Combo Piano (Takuma Watanabe) Another Rumor (2012) EWE
 Monday Michiru Selections (1997-2000) (2001) Polydor K.K.
 Michele Rosewoman’s New Yor-Uba Hallowed (2019) Advance Dance Diques
 Lincoln Goines The Art of the Bass Choir (2022) Origin Records
 Eva Cortes Crossing Borders (2017) Origin
 Doug Beavers Sol (2021) Circle 9 Records
 Santi DeBriano & Arkestra Bembe Ashanti (2022) JOJO RECORDS

External links
 Website
 Discography on All Music
 Credits on All Music
 IMDB
 Latin Grammys 
 Biography
 Drummer World

References
Modern Drummer April ’94, January 2004, January 2010,

DrumHead issue #22

Downbeat March 2010

American jazz drummers
Living people
1960 births
Musicians from New Haven, Connecticut
20th-century American drummers
American male drummers
Jazz musicians from Connecticut
20th-century American male musicians
American male jazz musicians
Origin Records artists
American people of Lebanese descent